The Government of the 4th Dáil or the 2nd Executive Council (19 September 1923 – 23 June 1927) was the Executive Council of the Irish Free State formed after the general election held on 27 August 1923. It was a minority Cumann na nGaedheal government led by W. T. Cosgrave as President of the Executive Council.

The 2nd Executive Council lasted  days.

2nd Executive Council of the Irish Free State
The 4th Dáil first met on 19 September 1923. The nomination of W. T. Cosgrave as President of the Executive Council was proposed by Richard Mulcahy and seconded by William Magennis. It was approved by the Dáil and Cosgrave was re-appointed by the governor-general.

Members of the Executive Council
The members of the Executive Council were proposed by the president and approved by the Dáil on 20 September 1923.

Ministers not members of the Executive Council
Extern Ministers were appointed by the Dáil on 10 October.

Parliamentary Secretaries
The Executive Council appointed Parliamentary Secretaries, with Daniel McCarthy continuing as Chief Whip from the beginning of the term.

Ministers and Secretaries Act 1924
The Ministers and Secretaries Act 1924 came into effect on 2 June 1924. On this date, the following ministerial titles were renamed:

Amendments to the Constitution of the Irish Free State
The following amendments to the Constitution of the Irish Free State were proposed by the Executive Council and passed by the Oireachtas:
 Amendment No. 1 (11 July 1925): Provided that the first Senators would vacate office in December 1925, made changes relating to the terms of office of senators, and the date on which Seanad elections were to be held.
 Amendment No. 3 (4 March 1927): Removed the requirement that the day of any general election would be declared a public holiday.
 Amendment No. 4 (4 March 1927): Extended the maximum term of the Dáil from four to six years.
 Amendment No. 2 (19 March 1927): Introduced a system of automatic re-election of the Ceann Comhairle in a general election.
 Amendment No. 5 (5 May 1927): Increased the maximum membership of the Executive Council from seven to twelve members.

See also
Dáil Éireann
Government of Ireland
Constitution of the Irish Free State
Politics of the Republic of Ireland

References

Ministries of George V
Government 04
Governments of the Irish Free State
1923 establishments in Ireland
1927 disestablishments in Ireland
Cabinets established in 1923
Cabinets disestablished in 1927
Minority governments
4th Dáil